Candice Hillebrand (also known as Candîce) (born 19 January 1977 in Johannesburg, South Africa) is a South African-born actress and singer-songwriter. She has also worked as a presenter and model. She is known for playing Nina Williams in the 2009 Tekken live-action movie, based on the popular video game series, Tekken.

Career 
Hillebrand's on-screen career started early in life by hosting South African children's television channel, KTV, at the age of 6. Hillebrand went on to appear in numerous commercials and has acted in both TV and film. In 2002, she signed with Musketeer Records and released her debut album, Chasing Your Tomorrows in 2003. She has also appeared in Maxim magazine.

In 2008, Hillebrand was offered the role of Nina Williams, a character in the film adaptation of the popular video game series, Tekken.

Discography

Albums 
 Chasing Your Tomorrows – (2003)

Singles 
 "Hello" – (2002)

Filmography 
 Act of Piracy – Tracey Andrews (1988)
 Accidents – Rebecca Powers (1988)
 Tyger, Tyger Burning Bright (1989)
 The Adventures of Sinbad – Deanna (1998)
 The Legend of the Hidden City – Kari (1999)
 Falling Rocks (2000)
 Othello: A South African Tale – Desdemona (2004)
 A Case of Murder – Colleen Norkem (2004)
 Beauty and the Beast – Ingrid (2005)
 Tekken – Nina Williams (2009)
 Blood of the Vikings (2014)

External links 
 Candîce Hillebrand on Myspace
 

1977 births
Living people
Singers from Johannesburg
20th-century South African women singers
21st-century South African women singers
South African singer-songwriters
South African pop singers
South African film actresses
South African people of British descent
South African television actresses
20th-century South African actresses
21st-century South African actresses
Alumni of Greenside High School